Jess McAvoy is a Brooklyn-based performing artist, songwriter and musician who was born in Perth, Western Australia. Their career spans over two decades and thirteen self-funded and self-produced studio recordings. McAvoy has toured extensively across Australia, Europe, Canada and the United States. They currently reside in Brooklyn, New York.

Biography
Jess McAvoy was born on 11 January 1980 in South Perth and started playing the guitar and writing music at the age of eleven.  When McAvoy was only 14, they created their own record label, Henduwin Music.  At sixteen, McAvoy performed in Western Australia for the first time in "Battle of the Bands" at the now defunct Fly by Night Club in Fremantle, where they won first prize.  In 1999, McAvoy began playing the Melbourne pub circuit.  As their career gained momentum, they became a staple on National Australian Radio and made appearances on Australian television.

In 2006, McAvoy released Into the Dark, which was declared Album of the Week by Beat Magazines Nick Snelling. He wrote, "This is truly a beautiful release. Into the Dark not only crystallizes the gorgeous melancholy of her songwriting, but finally does justice to that wonderful frayed beauty in her voice, that husk versus honey, and the raw introspection of her lyrics. An album to treasure". The album received high accolades from The Ages Clem Bastow, who described McAvoy as "one of the best rootsy female singer-songwriters" and the album as "a stunning spectrum of songs and emotions ... [which] explores the many facets of love and life, and most listeners will find more than a few songs resonating personally".
 
In 2008, McAvoy's follow up album, As the Sun Falls, also earned rave reviews. Kaz Mitchell from Inpress Magazine (Melbourne) and Drum Media (Sydney) described it as "Her best album to date. Thumbs up to a very cool album filled with plenty of verve". As the Sun Falls features their most popular single, The Sailor.

In 2011, McAvoy decided to relocate to North America. During their "farewell show" at the Corner Hotel in Melbourne, several fellow Australian performers surprised the audience by interpreting their favorite McAvoy songs. Liz Stringer and Dallas Frasca made cameo appearances. McAvoy also performed a special duet version of The Sailor with Wally de Backer (Gotye)..

Currently based in Brooklyn, New York, McAvoy continues to write, perform and collaborate with other artists.

Personal life

When McAvoy was ten, the family moved to Holland for five years before returning to Perth.  They speak fluent Dutch.

McAvoy has an older brother who is a professional DJ in Australia, and a younger sister.

McAvoy has cited many of their musical influences as Tori Amos, Madonna, Etta James, Edith Piaf, Rage Against the Machine and Nina Simone.

McAvoy's artistry extends beyond singing and song writing. They are also an exhibiting painter, and currently working on a autobiographical play.

McAvoy came out as non-binary in 2019.

Discography

Albums (all released on Henduwin Music)
 Deepest Feelings (cassette, 1994)
 Watershed (1997)
 Release (1999)
 Four Short Stories (2001)
 Light Wait (2002)
 En Masse (2004)
 Into the Dark (2006)
 As the Sun Falls (2008)
 Favorite Time of Day (2009)
 Favorite Time of Day (Live at the Wick) DVD release (2010)
 14 North (2010)
 Somewhere (with Liz Stringer) (2011)
 The Women (2014)

Awards
McAvoy was nominated at the West Australian Music Industry Awards, including the 1999 track "Girl", which was compiled on the related album, Kiss My WAMi '99. 
 Beat Magazine's Album of the Week for Into the Dark''
Australian Council grant recipient
Short listed for the APRA Professional Development Award

References

External links

 

1980 births
Australian  guitarists
Australian  singer-songwriters
Australian LGBT singers
Living people
Musicians from Perth, Western Australia
21st-century Australian singers
21st-century guitarists
Non-binary musicians